McSpadden is a surname. Notable people with the surname include:

Clem McSpadden (1925–2008), American politician
Dwight McSpadden (1932–1990), American football coach
Gary McSpadden (1943–2020), American pastor, singer, songwriter, producer, television host and motivational speaker
Lara McSpadden (born 1999), Australian women's basketball player
Lealand McSpadden (born 1946), American racing driver
Phil McSpadden, American softball coach

See also
Alex McSpadyen (1914–1978), Scottish footballer
McSpadden Hollow, a valley in the U.S. state of Missouri